Węsiory  (Kashubian: Wãsórë) is a village in the administrative district of Gmina Sulęczyno, within Kartuzy County, Pomeranian Voivodeship, in northern Poland. It has a population of 754.

For details of the history of the region, see History of Pomerania.

Near the village is a concentration of stone circles and burial places of the Wielbark Culture.

References

Gallery - Iron Age stone circles and burial places

Villages in Kartuzy County